Madam is a five-piece London based band, fronted by Sukie Smith. Their music is often described as possessing a smoky, nocturnal quality with a pop sensibility that has led to comparisons to artists such as Portishead, The Velvet Underground, PJ Harvey and Cat Power, as well as more mainstream artists such as Goldfrapp and Fleetwood Mac.

The band has experienced several line-up changes since its inception, with vocalist, guitarist and principal songwriter Smith being the only constant member.

History

Releasing debut single Call America in July 2007, the following February saw Smith - by now signed to Reveal Records - release the album In Case Of Emergency to much critical acclaim. Having finally established a settled line-up for her band, a five track EP Fall On Your Knees followed in July, which was to complete the band's releases through Reveal.

Late in 2008 the band were invited by Bowers & Wilkins to record a session at Peter Gabriel's Real World Studios as part of their "Society Of Sound Music" download series. This session was later to form the basis of sophomore album, Gone Before Morning (2011) released through Smith's own Shilling Boy label.

Members

Madam's current line-up is completed by Sarah Gill (cello, keyboards, saw and vocals), Sam Willard (guitar) Gareth Moss (bass) and Jeff Townsin (drums and percussion).

Collaborators and former members include Chris Clarke, Adam Franklin, Gavin Pearce, John Robertson, Simon Breed, Marc Tchanz, Mara Carlyse, Moose, Brock Norman Brock, Lee Tryming, Howard Monk, Sean Reed, Jon Redfern, Patrick Durkan, Ross Drummond, Nick Bergin, Jason Buckle and John Mercedo.

Discography

Albums

In Case of Emergency (2008)

Track listing:

1.  "Fall On Your Knees"

2. "Calling for Love"

3. "Strange Love"

4. "Call America"

5. "Girl Down"

6. "Still"

7. "Horses"

8. "Can't Help Myself"

9. "Superfast Highway"

10. "Dirty That Makes Me"

11. "Rope Trick"

Gone Before Morning (2011)

Track listing:

1. "You Lead I Follow"

2. "The Ground Will Claim You"

3. "The Snake"

4. "Weekend Love"

5. "Tar and Serpents"

6. "Someone in Love"

7. "Cover the Ground"

8. "If You're Looking for a Way Out"

9. "Marine Boy"

10. "Ride the Waves"

EPs

Fall On Your Knees (2008)

Track listing:

1. "Fall on your knees" [remix]

2. "St Mary"

3. "Some Other Elvis"

4. "Not Here Yet"

References

 The Independent Ones to watch: Five of the best new acts (April 2008)

 Bowers & Wilkins Society of Sound

External links
 Website

Musical groups established in 2004
Musical groups from London